Takhir Kamaletdinov is a Soviet sprint canoer who competed in the mid to late 1980s. He won two medals in the C-1 10000 m at the ICF Canoe Sprint World Championships with a silver in 1985 and a bronze in 1987.

References

Living people
Soviet male canoeists
Year of birth missing (living people)
ICF Canoe Sprint World Championships medalists in Canadian